

Results
Arsenal's score comes first

Football League Second Division

Final League table

FA Cup

References

1903-04
English football clubs 1903–04 season